Coming Home is an album recorded by Chinese Cantopop singer Faye Wong. It was released on her return to Hong Kong in 1992 after her year-long stay in New York City.

Background 
Wong had issued her first three official albums under the stage name Shirley Wong. The cover for Coming Home prominently shows the name "Faye", and from 1994, after the release of Sky she used name "Wáng Fēi" on album sleeves.

This album included "Fragile Woman", a cover of a Japanese song "Rouge" composed by the J-pop diva Miyuki Nakajima and sung by Naomi Chiaki. While this song had been covered by other Chinese singers, Wong's version nonetheless swept over Hong Kong and single-handedly lifted her to stardom. 
It became the No. 1 hit on almost all local radio stations and won Song of the Year at several musical awards. (Thanks to Wong's cover, this 1972 song—in different language versions—would in the early 1990s become a huge regional hit in Thailand, Vietnam and the rest of Southeast Asia and even Turkey; the most popular English version was titled "Broken-Hearted Woman".) 
Wong also recorded a Mandarin version of "Fragile Woman", released on her 1994 compilation album Faye Best.

The album also included her first English-language song, "Kisses in the Wind".  
Wong stated in a 1994 concert that she very much liked this song, after which various websites listed it as her personal favourite.

Composition 
Coming Home was a notable change in musical direction from the more traditional Cantopop fare of her earlier albums. Like them, it incorporated R&B influences.

Track listing

References

1992 albums
Faye Wong albums
Cinepoly Records albums
Cantopop albums